Severe fever with thrombocytopenia syndrome (SFTS) is a tick-borne infection. Signs and symptoms include fever, vomiting, diarrhea, loss of consciousness and heamorrhage.

It is an emerging infectious disease caused by Dabie bandavirus also known as the SFTS virus, first reported between late March and mid-July 2009 in rural areas of Hubei and Henan provinces in Central China. SFTS has fatality rates ranging from 12% to as high as 30% in some areas. The major clinical symptoms of SFTS are fever, vomiting, diarrhea, multiple organ failure, thrombocytopenia (low platelet count), leucopenia (low white blood cell count), and elevated liver enzyme levels.

Virology
SFTS virus (SFTSV) is a virus in the order Bunyavirales. Person-to-person transmission was not noted in early reports but has since been documented.

The life cycle of the SFTSV most likely involves arthropod vectors and animal hosts. Humans appear to be largely accidental hosts. SFTSV has been detected in Haemaphysalis longicornis ticks.

Epidemiology
SFTS occurs in China's rural areas from March to November with the majority of cases from April to July. In 2013, Japan and Korea also reported several cases with deaths.

In July 2013, South Korea reported a total of eight deaths since August 2012.

In July 2017, Japanese doctors reported that a woman had died of SFTS after being bitten by a cat that may have itself infected by a tick. The woman had no visible tick bites, leading doctors to believe that the cat — which died as well — was the transmission vector.

In early 2020 an outbreak occurred in East China, more than 37 people were found with SFTS in Jiangsu province, while 23 more were found infected in Anhui province in August 2020. Seven people have died.

Evolution
The virus originated 50–150 years ago and has undergone a recent population expansion.

History
In 2009 Xue-jie Yu and colleagues isolated the SFTS virus (SFTSV) from SFTS patients’ blood.

References

External links 

Arthropod-borne viral fevers and viral haemorrhagic fevers
Insect-borne diseases
Zoonoses